Splean is a popular Russian rock band, formed in Saint Petersburg in 1994.  Since then, they have remained one of the most popular rock bands in Russia and the former Soviet Union. The band's name is derived from "spleen" (in the sense of "depression"), and the "ea" spelling in English is a pun on the spelling of the Beatles. It was borrowed from a short poem by Sasha Cherny, which the band set to music.

History
Lead singer Alexander Vasilyev and bass guitarist Alexander Morozov decided to form a band together while working in "Buff" theatre as stage workers. Later, keyboardist Nikolay Rostovsky and other musicians joined them. Despite the risk of losing their jobs, they began recording their first album Pyl'naja byl' (Dusty Fact) in one of the theatre's studios at night. Their growing popularity was made evident by Boris Grebenshchikov's and Konstantin Kinchev's support. In 1996, the band began to play concerts in Moscow and other cities. In subsequent years, Splean recorded several albums and a number of hit singles, including "Orbit bez sahara" ("Sugar Free Orbit"), "Novye ljudi" ("New People"), "Vremja nazad" ("Backwards Time"), and "My sideli i kurili" ("We Were Sitting and Smoking")

Despite rumours that the group were on the verge of breaking up in 2004, Splean continues to perform throughout Russia and the world. The band frequently experiments and evolves, so the current version of Splean is quite different from its original version.

In 2004, the band garnered international attention for the inclusion of their song "Bud' moej ten'ju" ("Be My Shadow") in the film adaptation of Sergey Lukyanenko's bestselling novel, Night Watch.

In 1998, Splean opened for The Rolling Stones at Moscow's Luzhniki Stadium, during the Bridges to Babylon Tour. Splean headlined the Krylya rock festival in 2005 and Nashestvie in 2015. "Skazhi" ("Tell Her"), the single from Razdvoenie lichnosti (Split Personality), topped song and video charts on the radio and MTV, and the song's video was awarded the MTV Russian Music Award for Best Video.

The band won several Nashe Radio "Chart Dozen" awards, including Best Song and Chart Leader for "Orkestr" ("Оrchestra") in 2015 and Best Album for Obman Zrenija (Optical Illusion) in 2013.

Members
Alexander Vasilyev - lead vocals, guitar
Vadim Sergeyev - guitar
Dmitriy Kunin - bass-guitar
Nikolay Rostovsky - keyboards
Alexey Mesherekov - drums

Discography

Soundtracks 
 2000 - Брат 2 (Brother 2) — "Линия жизни" (Life Line)
 2001 - Тайный знак (Secret Sign) - "Моё сердце" (My Heart), "Пластмассовая жизнь" (Plastic Life)
 2002 - Война (War) - "SOS", "Феллини" (Felini), "Пластмассовая жизнь" (Plastic Life)
 2004 - Егерь - Сломано всё (Everything is Broken), "Время, назад!" (Time, Backwards!)
 2006 - Живой (Alive) - "Сиануквиль" (Sihanoukville), "Романс" (Romance)
 2008 - Качели (Swing) - "Мама миа" (Mama Mia), "Мобильный" (Mobile)
 2012 - Отпуск (Vacation) - "Романс" (Romance)
 2013 - Посредник (Mediator) - "Время, назад!" (Time, Backwards!)
 Grand Theft Auto IV - Линия жизни (Life Line) on radio station Vladivostok FM

External links

Official site 
YouTube channel
Russmus info on Splean, including lyrics and translations
Last.FM Сплин page
Splin and Alexander Vasilev

References

Musical groups from Saint Petersburg
Russian rock music groups
Russian alternative rock groups
Musical groups established in 1994
Winners of the Golden Gramophone Award
Russian activists against the 2022 Russian invasion of Ukraine